The following is a list of software products by Adobe Inc.

Active products

Software suites

Experience Cloud

Adobe Experience Cloud (AEC) is a collection of integrated online marketing and Web analytics solutions by Adobe Inc. It includes a set of analytics, social, advertising, media optimization, targeting, Web experience management and content management solutions. It includes:
 Advertising Cloud
Analytics
Audience Manager
Campaign
Commerce Cloud
 Experience Manager
Experience Manager Assets
Experience Manager Sites
Experience Manager Forms
Marketo Engage
Primetime
Target

Creative Suite

Adobe Creative Suite (CS) was a series of software suites of graphic design, video editing, and web development applications made or acquired by Adobe Systems. It included:

 Acrobat
 After Effects
 Audition
 Bridge
 Contribute
 Device Central
 Dreamweaver
 Dynamic Link
 Encore
 Fireworks
 Flash Professional
 Illustrator
 InDesign
 OnLocation
 Photoshop
 Premiere Pro

Creative Cloud

Adobe Creative Cloud is the successor to Creative Suite. It is based on a software as a service model. It includes everything in Creative Suite 6 with the exclusion of Fireworks and Encore, as both applications were discontinued. It also introduced a few new programs, including Muse, Animate, InCopy and Story CC Plus.

Technical Communication Suite

Adobe Technical Communication Suite is a collection of applications made by Adobe Systems for technical communicators, help authors, instructional designers, and eLearning and training design professionals. It includes:
 Acrobat
 Captivate
 FrameMaker
 Presenter
 RoboHelp

eLearning Suite

Adobe eLearning Suite was a collection of applications made by Adobe Systems for learning professionals, instructional designers, training managers, content developers, and educators.
 Acrobat
 Captivate
 Device Central
 Dreamweaver
 Flash Professional
 Photoshop

Discontinued products 
 Acrobat Approval allows users to deploy electronic forms based on the Acrobat Portable Document Format (PDF).
Acrobat Capture is a document processing utility for Windows from Adobe Systems that converts a scan of any paper document into a PDF file with selectable text through OCR technology.
Acrobat Elements was a very basic version of the Acrobat family that was released by Adobe Systems. Its key feature advantage over the free Adobe Acrobat Reader was the ability to create reliable PDF files from Microsoft Office applications.
Acrobat InProduction is a pre-press tools suite for Acrobat released by Adobe in 2000 to handle color separation and pre-flighting of PDF files for printing.
 Acrobat Messenger is a document utility for Acrobat users that was released by Adobe Systems in 2000 to convert paper documents into PDF files that can be e-mailed, faxed, or shared online.
ActiveShare is a discontinued photo-sharing platform distributed by Adobe Systems. The Photoshop Album application replaced ActiveShare in 2003.
Atmosphere was a software platform for interacting with 3D computer graphics.
 Authorware was an interpreted, flowchart-based, graphical programming language.
 BrowserLab was a service that enabled cross-browser testing by producing screenshots of websites from various web browsers across different platforms (Windows and OS X are currently supported).
 Central was a runtime environment developed by Macromedia (now just Adobe since being acquired) for developing application software that runs on different operating systems and are distributed over the Internet.
 Cool Edit Pro was an audio editing application from Syntrillium Software (now acquired by Adobe) that was the predecessor to Adobe Audition.
 Contribute is a discontinued specialized HTML editor. As its name implies, it is intended to contribute content to existing websites, including blogs.
 Collage is a collage maker once distributed by Adobe Systems, until being replaced by Adobe Spark or Adobe Photoshop.
 Creative Mark
 Debut is software used to share your work on tablet devices.
Adobe Design Collection was an early software suite from Adobe Systems, first released on July 30, 1999. It included applications such as Acrobat, Illustrator, InDesign, and Photoshop.
Device Central is a software program created and released by Adobe Systems as a part of the Adobe Creative Suite 3 (CS3) in March 2007.
Dimensions was a 3D modeling and rendering program that was sold by Adobe Systems in the 1990s. It had the unique ability to export to PostScript files. Years after the discontinuation of Dimensions, Adobe released Dimension CC.
Director was a multimedia application authoring platform created by Macromedia and managed by Adobe Systems until its discontinuation.
 Displaytalk was a Display PostScript debugger and development environment created by Emerald City Software and distributed by Adobe Systems.
 Dreamweaver Extension
 Drive was a utility for accessing Adobe Systems' cloud-based asset workflow service.
 DS Community Edition
 DV Rack is a suite of video recording and monitoring tools that turns videographers' laptop computers into portable digital video recorders, field monitors and video signal evaluation processors.
 Edge is a suite of web development tools developed by Adobe that enhances the capabilities of their other applications, such as Dreamweaver.
 Encore (discontinued in CC) is a DVD authoring software tool produced by Adobe Systems and targeted at professional video producers.
Extreme was PDF-based printing technology that was developed by Adobe Systems and released in 1996 for service bureaus, prepress shops, and commercial printers.
 Fireworks (discontinued in CC) is a discontinued bitmap and vector graphics editor, which Adobe acquired in 2005.
FlashPaper was a software application developed by Blue Pacific Software before its acquisition by Macromedia, which was later acquired by Adobe Systems.
Flash Catalyst (formerly known by its codename Thermo) is a designers' tool for creating the user interface for Rich Web Applications (also known as Rich Internet Applications).
Flash Media Live Encoder (FMLE) was a free live encoding software product from Adobe Systems. It was available for Microsoft Windows and Mac OS.
Flash Player (also called Shockwave Flash in Internet Explorer, Firefox, and Google Chrome) was computer software for content created on the Adobe Flash platform.
 Flash Professional (now Adobe Animate) is Flash's content authoring application.
 Form Manager was a form managing tool from Adobe which was replaced by Adobe Experience Manager Forms.
 FrameMaker XML Author was an XML/DITA authoring tool from Adobe, based on the XML Author mode from the corresponding full version of FrameMaker.
FreeHand was a computer application for creating two-dimensional vector graphics oriented primarily to professional illustration, desktop publishing and content creation for the Web.
Fuse, formerly Fuse Character Creator, is a 3D character animation application originally developed by Mixamo. It was acquired by Adobe Systems in June 2015 and was discontinued while in beta testing.
 Adobe Graphics Server, formerly Adobe AlterCast, was server-based asset management software from Adobe Systems for version tracking of graphics assets in production workflows.
 GoLive was a WYSIWYG HTML editor and web site management application from Adobe Systems.
 HomeSite was an HTML editor originally developed by Nick Bradbury. Unlike WYSIWYG HTML editors such as FrontPage and Dreamweaver, HomeSite was designed for direct editing, or "hand coding", of HTML and other website languages.
 HomePublisher was a basic page layout application that was marketed by Adobe Systems.
 Ideas for Android is a mobile digital sketchpad app that lets you design almost anywhere using vectors, layers, and color themes.
 Illustrator Line
 ImageReady is a discontinued bitmap graphics editor that was shipped with Adobe Photoshop for six years. It was available for Windows, Classic Mac OS and Mac OS X from 1998 to 2007. ImageReady was designed for web development and closely interacted with Photoshop.
 ImageStyler was a product created by Adobe Systems released in 1998 until 2000 and was replaced by LiveMotion.
 InContext Editing is an online service that allows clients make their own content updates, while enabling designers maintain the integrity of their Dreamweaver-built website.
 JRun is a J2EE application server, originally developed in 1997 as a Java Servlet engine by Live Software and subsequently purchased by Allaire, who brought out the first J2EE compliant version.
 LeanPrint is enterprise-class, printing software that dramatically reduces print costs by using an innovative method to reformat the layout of documents when printing from popular applications and browsers.
 LiveMotion was a product created by Adobe Systems released in 2000 and perceived as a direct competitor to Macromedia Flash.
 LaserTalk
 Media Gateway is a component to Adobe Connect Universal Voice for sending and receiving audio from a SIP server.
 Media Player is a discontinued desktop media player that allowed users to manage and interact with their media content, and allowed content publishers to define branding and advertising in and around their content.
 Muse is a discontinued offline website builder used to create fixed, fluid, or adaptive websites, without the need to write code. It was discontinued in the CC 2018 version of Muse
 NetAverages was an online service from Adobe Systems that provided internet trend data to design online content for broad audiences across multiple screen formats.
 OnLocation (formerly Serious Magic DV Rack) was a program that is included with Adobe Premiere Pro to log physical media information and to tag ingested media with metadata. It was replaced by Adobe Prelude in Adobe Creative Suite 6.
 Ovation is a presentation software developed by Adobe Systems, originally released by Serious Magic Inc.
 PageMaker (formerly Aldus PageMaker) is a discontinued desktop publishing computer program introduced in 1985 by the Aldus Corporation on the Apple Macintosh.
 PageMill is a WYSIWYG HTML editor developed by Adobe Systems.
 PDF JobReady, formerly PDF Transit, was a software development kit released by Adobe Systems that allowed OEMs to build a workflow to let users generate PDF files that can be transmitted directly over the internet to a print shop.
 PDF Scan
 Persuasion (formerly Aldus Persuasion) is a discontinued presentation program developed for the Macintosh platform by Aldus Corporation.
PhoneGap Build is a mobile application development framework created by Nitobi (now owned by Adobe Systems) for cross-platform mobile app development. It enables software programmers to build hybrid web applications for mobile devices using CSS3, HTML5, and JavaScript, instead of relying on platform-specific APIs. It was discontinued on October 1, 2020.
PhoneGap Developer is a testing utility for web developers and designers using the PhoneGap framework. Users can connect to the PhoneGap desktop app to instantly view and test projects on their device.
 PhotoDeluxe was a consumer-oriented image editing software line published by Adobe Systems from 1996 until July 8, 2002. At that time it was replaced by Adobe's newly launched consumer-oriented image editing software Photoshop Elements.
 Photoshop Album is a piece of application software by Adobe Systems designed to import, organize and edit digital photos, and allows quick and easy searching and sharing of entire photo collections.
Prelude was an ingest and logging tool for tagging media with metadata for searching, post-production workflows, and footage lifecycle management made to work closely with Adobe Premiere Pro. It has been discontinued from September 8, 2021, although support will continue until September 8, 2024.
Premiere Clip is a professional video editing mobile application. It was replaced by Premiere Rush in April 2016.
Premiere Express was a rich Internet application for simple editing of digital video files. The release was announced on February 21, 2007.
 Premiere Limited Edition (LE) was a video editor for novice video editors and hobbyists. It contains most of the features of the professional version but with fewer and simpler options. It was instead replaced by Premiere Elements in September 2004.
 PressReady was a software PostScript 3 rasterizer developed by Adobe Systems to allow printing of PostScript documents to color inkjet printers without such capabilities.
 PressWise was digital imposition software to quickly and easily impose most any variety of flat and folding layouts.
Preview CC is a discontinued mobile app used to preview mobile designs.
Proto is an iOS-only application that allows users to create wireframes of websites and apps.
Publish, formerly Omniture Publish, was an on-demand web content management system that was originally developed by Omniture, which was acquired by Adobe in October 2009.
Revel is a discontinued photo-sharing service that bring photos and videos together, share them privately, preserve them forever, and delight in reliving memories.
 RoboInfo
 RoboSourceControl
 RoboPDF
Scout is a profiling tool for Flash SWF files.
Secure Content Servers
Shockwave (formerly Macromedia Shockwave) is a discontinued multimedia platform for building interactive multimedia applications and video games.
 Soundbooth is a discontinued digital audio editor by Adobe Systems Incorporated for Windows XP, Windows Vista, 7 and Mac OS X.
Social
 Studio was an online web-based resource operated by Adobe Systems for web, print, digital imaging, and digital video professionals. It was later superseded by Adobe Design Center.
Speedgrade was a professional color correction application that was developed and marketed by Adobe.
 Stock Photos (now Adobe Stock) is a stock image database that was originally integrated with Adobe Bridge in Adobe Creative Suite 2 and 3.
Story is a discontinued collaborative script development tool from Adobe Systems Inc. It included scheduling tools, allowing schedules to be created from one or many scripts.
 Streamline is a discontinued line tracing program developed and published by Adobe Systems. Its primary purpose is to convert scanned bitmaps into vector artwork.
 SVG Viewer was a plug-in from Adobe Systems that allowed SVG (Scalable Vector Graphics) files to be viewed on a web browser.
 Type Manager was the name of a family of computer programs created and marketed by Adobe Systems for use with their PostScript Type 1 fonts. The last release was Adobe ATM Light 4.1.2, per Adobe's FTP (at the time).
 Type on Call was an on-demand typeface library distributed by Adobe Systems on CD-ROM.
 Ultra (formerly Serious Magic Ultra) is a discontinued vector keying application, helping produce blue-screen/green-screen effects for video (although the background can actually be any color).
 Version Cue was revision control software from Adobe Systems that enabled users to track files through file metadata.
 Visual Communicator is a Windows-based video-broadcasting software that enables teachers, lecturers and students to create presentation videos by using graphics, audio, and special effects and present in email, the Internet, a CD or DVD, or over a Closed-Circuit System.
 Vlog It!
Voco is an unreleased audio editing and generating prototype software by Adobe that enables novel editing and generation of audio.

See also
 Creative Cloud controversy
 Macromedia, a company Adobe acquired

References

List of Adobe Software
Adobe Software